"Second"  is a song recorded by South Korean singer Hyoyeon featuring Bibi. It was released digitally on August 9, 2021, by SM Entertainment. The song is written by Jeong Ha-ri (153Joombas) and Bibi, composed by Melanie Fontana, Gino Barletta, Britten Newbill, Michel Schulz and Bibi, and arranged by Lindgren. Initially a standalone single, the song was later included on Hyoyeon's first extended play, Deep, released on May 16, 2022.

Release and composition
On August 3, 2021, it was announced that Hyoyeon will be releasing a digital single titled "Second" featuring Bibi. On August 8, the music video teaser was released. A day later, the song together with the music video was released.

"Second" is composed by Bibi, Jeong Ha-ri (153Joombas), Melanie Fontana, Gino Barletta, Britten Newbill, Michel Schulz, and Lindgren. Musically, the song is described as a summer dance pop song with "light rhythm" and characterized by "electric piano, horn, cowbell, and heavy bass" with lyrics about telling the listener that "it is okay to give themselves time to breathe in their busy life". "Second" was composed in the key of A-flat major, with a tempo of 95 beats per minute.

Commercial performance
"Second" debuted at position 182 on South Korea's Gaon Digital Chart in the chart issue dated August 8–14, 2021. The song then ascended to position 176 in the chart issue dated August 15–21, 2021. The song also debuted at position 28 on Gaon Download Chart in the chart issue dated August 8–14, 2021. The song debuted at position 17 on Billboard World Digital Songs in the chart issue dated August 21, 2021.

Promotion
Prior to the song's release, on August 9, 2021, Hyoyeon held a live event called "HYO 'Second' COUNTDOWN LIVE" on V Live to introduce the song and communicate with her fans. Following the release of the single, she performed "Second" on four music programs: Mnet's M Countdown on August 12, KBS2's Music Bank on August 13, MBC's Show! Music Core on August 14, and SBS's Inkigayo on August 15.

Credits and personnel
Credits adapted from Melon.

Studio
 SM LVYIN Studio – recording, engineering for mix, mixing
 Feelghood Studio – recording
 SM Yellow Tail Studio – Digital editing
 821 Sound Mastering – mastering

Personnel

 SM Entertainment – Executive producer
 Lee Soo-man – producer
 Yoo Young-jin – Music & sound supervisor
 Hyoyeon – vocals, background vocals
 Bibi – vocals, background vocals, lyrics, composition
 Jeong Ha-ri (153Joombas) – lyrics
 Melanie Fontana – composition
 Gino Barletta – composition
 Britten Newbill – composition
 Michel Schulz – composition
 Lindgren – arrangement
 Kim Yeon-seo – vocal directing, background vocals
 Lee Ji-hong – recording, engineering for mix, mixing
 Park Jae-sun – recording
 Noh Min-ji – digital editing
 Kwon Nam-woo – mastering

Charts

Release history

References

2021 songs
2021 singles
SM Entertainment singles
Korean-language songs
Songs written by Gino Barletta
Songs written by Melanie Fontana